Chandran Nair is a Malaysian businessman and founder of The Global Institute for Tomorrow, an independent think-tank based in Hong Kong.  He is also Project Director for The Other Hundred, an international photography competition and photo-book project.

Background
Nair was born in Malaysia, the seventh of eight children. His parents were immigrants to Malaysia from India, and not well off, with all the children sharing a room. He studied chemical engineering in the UK, where he then worked for a few years. At 28, he joined the anti-apartheid movement in South Africa, building sanitation and water systems by day on a stipend and playing the saxophone in his free time in a band. He later earned a master's degree in environmental engineering from Bangkok.

Career 

Nair is a member of the World Economic Forum Global Agenda Council for Sustainability and has argued at numerous forums including the WEF, APEC  and OECD  about the need for radical reform of the current economic model and strict limits on consumption. Nair was previously Chairman of Environmental Resources Management (ERM), building the company to be the leading environmental consultancy in Asia Pacific. He left in March 2004.

Nair is a frequent contributor to various media outlets including The Financial Times, The Guardian, The Huffington Post, The New York Times.  and South China Morning Post. He is the author of Consumptionomics: Asia's role in reshaping capitalism and saving the planet, named one of the top ten books of 2011 by The Globalist. In 2018 he published The Sustainable State: The Future of Government, Economy, and Society.

Controversy 
On August 26, 2021, Nair wrote an op-ed in Time magazine accusing Nicole Kidman of using her "White Privilege" to avoid being quarantined when arriving in Hong Kong to film the Amazon Prime Video series Expats. Hong Kong's Commerce and Economic Development Bureau (CEDB) responded in a press statement that Kidman received a quarantine exemption for the purpose of performing designated professional work and necessary operation of Hong Kong's economy, and a CEDB permanent secretary wrote a letter to the editor of Time stating that Nair's claim was "not only just misplaced but absurd".

References

Living people
Malaysian businesspeople
Year of birth missing (living people)